In mathematics, specifically computability and set theory, an ordinal  is said to be computable or recursive if there is a computable well-ordering of a subset of the natural numbers having the order type .

It is easy to check that  is computable. The successor of a computable ordinal is computable, and the set of all computable ordinals is closed downwards.  

The Church–Kleene ordinal is a limit ordinal. Since there are only countably many computable relations, there are also only countably many computable ordinals. Thus,  is countable.

The computable ordinals are exactly the ordinals that have an ordinal notation in Kleene's .

See also
Arithmetical hierarchy
Large countable ordinal
Ordinal analysis
Ordinal notation

References 

 Hartley Rogers Jr. The Theory of Recursive Functions and Effective Computability, 1967.  Reprinted 1987, MIT Press,  (paperback), 
 Gerald Sacks  Higher Recursion Theory.  Perspectives in mathematical logic, Springer-Verlag, 1990. 

Set theory
Computability theory
Ordinal numbers